Ruhe is a German surname. It may refer to:

People
Ruhe (Māori chief) (? - 1865)  Ngāpuhi iwi (tribe) in northern New Zealand
Johann Friedrich Ruhe (1699 - 1776) German composer
Volker Rühe (1942)   German politician affiliated to the CDU.  German Defence minister from April 1, 1992
Michael Ruhe (1980) German rower at the 2004 Summer Olympics
Barnaby Ruhe American artist
Martin Ruhe (born 1970) German cinematographer known for his work on the film Harry Brown
Brian Ruhe (1974)  American former ice sledge hockey player

Other
Ruhe, meine Seele!, Op. 27, No. 1, composed by Richard Strauss in 1894. 
Kluge-Ruhe Aboriginal Art Collection of the University of Virginia
Ruhe (song), Schiller